Ezra Churchill Henniger (1 May 1927 – 22 January 1990) was a Canadian middle-distance runner. He competed in the men's 800 metres at the 1948 Summer Olympics.

He was the son of Ezra Churchill Henniger, a politician and pioneer citizen of Grand Forks, British Columbia. In 1955, he married Lillian Gloria Harrison. He died in a single person motor vehicle accident in 1990.

References

1927 births
1990 deaths
Athletes (track and field) at the 1948 Summer Olympics
Canadian male middle-distance runners
Olympic track and field athletes of Canada
Athletes (track and field) at the 1950 British Empire Games
Commonwealth Games competitors for Canada
Athletes from Vancouver
20th-century Canadian people